2D or 2-D may refer to:

 Two-dimensional Euclidean space
 2D geometric model
 2D computer graphics
 2-D (character), a member of the virtual band Gorillaz
 Index finger, the second digit (abbreviated 2D) of the hand
 Oflag II-D
 Stalag II-D
 Transcription factor II D
 Two Dickinson Street Co-op, a student dining cooperative at Princeton University
 2D animation, or traditional animation
 Two-dimensional correlation analysis
 Nintendo 2DS, the third iteration in the Nintendo 3DS line, released in 2013
 New Nintendo 2DS XL, the sixth iteration in the Nintendo 3DS line, released in 2017 and a larger version of the 2DS
 2degrees, New Zealand telecommunications provider
 Twopence (British pre-decimal coin), routinely abbreviated 2d.

See also
 D2 (disambiguation)
 IID (disambiguation)